Froggattella kirbii, commonly known as the common froglet ant is a species of ant in the genus Froggattella. The species is common in drier sclerophyll areas in various states of Australia.

References

External links

Dolichoderinae
Insects described in 1865
Hymenoptera of Australia